The Kirnbach is a short river of Baden-Württemberg, Germany. It is a tributary of the Schiltach near Schramberg.

See also
List of rivers of Baden-Württemberg

Rivers of Baden-Württemberg
Rivers of the Black Forest
Rivers of Germany